Jean Engler may refer to:
 Jean Engler (canoeist), Swiss slalom canoeist
 Jean E. Engler, United States Army officer